Leila Fatoumata N'Diaye (born 27 March 1994), commonly known as Fatoumata, is a Malian naturalised Equatoguinean footballer who plays as a forward. She was a member of the Mali women's national football team after naturalisation she started playing for the Equatorial Guinea women's national football team. She was part of the team at the 2011 FIFA Women's World Cup. At the club level, she plays for Inter Continental in Equatorial Guinea.

International goals
Scores and results list Equatorial Guinea's goal tally first

References

External links
 

1994 births
Living people
Place of birth missing (living people)
Malian women's footballers
Women's association football forwards
Mali women's international footballers
Naturalized citizens of Equatorial Guinea
Equatoguinean women's footballers
Equatorial Guinea women's international footballers
2011 FIFA Women's World Cup players
Dual internationalists (women's football)
21st-century Malian people